The surname Whitman may refer to:

 Bertha Yerex Whitman, American architect
 Brian Whitman, American comedian and talk show host on 97.1 KLSX in Los Angeles
 Charles Whitman (19411966), American marine and spree killer who perpetrated the 1966 University of Texas tower shooting
 Charles Huntington Whitman (18731937), English professor
 Charles Otis Whitman (18421910), American zoologist
 Charles S. Whitman, American judge and Governor of New York
 Christine Todd Whitman, former New Jersey Governor, former head of the EPA
 Dane Whitman, fictional character from Marvel Comics
 Bernard Whitman, Democratic strategist and pollster
 Debra Whitman, fictional character from Spider-Man
 Edmund Burke Whitman (1812–1883), quartermaster during the American Civil War.
 Frank Perkins Whitman (1853–1919), American physicist
 Gayne Whitman (1890–1958), American actor
 George Whitman, Shakespeare and Company proprietor
 Kari Whitman, American model and actress Kari Kennell
 Keith Fullerton Whitman, American electronic musician
 James Whitman, American lawyer
 Lemuel Whitman, American politician
 Mae Whitman, American actress
 Malcolm Whitman, American tennis player
 Marcus Whitman, American physician and missionary, killed in the Whitman massacre
 Marina von Neumann Whitman, American economist, writer and former automobile executive
 Martin J. Whitman, American investment advisor
 Meg Whitman, president and CEO of eBay
 Narcissa Whitman, American missionary in the Oregon Country
 Richard G. Whitman, British academic (born 1965)
 Robert Whitman, American artist
 Royal Emerson Whitman, American army officer (1811–1913)
 Sarah Helen Power Whitman, American poet, essayist, transcendentalist, Spiritualist
 Sarah W. Whitman, artist
 Slim Whitman, American country singer
 Stuart Whitman (1928–2020), American actor
 Sylvia Palacios Whitman, Chilean-American artist
 Walt Whitman, American poet and humanist
 William F. Whitman, Jr. (1914–2007), horticulturist
 Whitman Sisters, Mabel, Essie, Alice, and Alberta

See also
Whitman (disambiguation)
Whiteman (disambiguation)
Wittmann